CENI is an abbreviation for Commission Électorale Nationale Indépendante, and may refer to:
Independent National Electoral Commission (Democratic Republic of the Congo)
Independent National Electoral Commission (Guinea)